Yazid Heimur (born 18 November 2002) is a German professional footballer who most recently played as a midfielder for  club Viktoria Berlin.

Career
Heimur was one of four players to leave 3. Liga club Viktoria Berlin in the winter transfer window 2021–22 due to "personal reasons".

References

External links

2002 births
Living people
German footballers
Association football midfielders
Tennis Borussia Berlin players
FC Viktoria 1889 Berlin players
3. Liga players